The Atom is a lost 1918 silent film drama directed by Frank Borzage. It stars Pauline Starke and Belle Bennett. It was produced by Triangle Film Corportion and released by Triangle Studios.

Cast
Pauline Starke - Jenny
Belle Bennett - Belle Hathaway
Harry Mestayer - Montague Booth
Ruth Handforth - Miss Miggs
Walter E. Perkins - Oldson (*as Walter Perkins)
Lincoln Stedman - Ethelbert
Eugene Burr - Benson
Tom Buckingham - Jerry
Frank Borzage

References

External links
 The Atom at IMDb.com

1918 films
American silent feature films
Lost American films
American black-and-white films
1918 lost films
Silent American drama films
1918 drama films
Lost drama films
Films directed by William C. Dowlan
1910s American films
1910s English-language films
English-language drama films